Harry Baur (12 April 1880 – 8 April 1943) was a French actor.

Initially a stage actor, Baur appeared in about 80 films between 1909 and 1942. He gave an acclaimed performance as the composer Ludwig van Beethoven in the biopic Beethoven's Great Love (Un grand amour de Beethoven, 1936), directed by Abel Gance, and as Jean Valjean in Raymond Bernard's  version of Les Misérables (1934). He also acted in Victorin-Hippolyte Jasset's silent film, Beethoven (1909), and in La voyante (1923), Sarah Bernhardt's last film.

In 1942, while in Berlin, to star in his last film Symphone eines Lebens, Baur's wife, Rika Radifé, was arrested by the Gestapo and charged with espionage. His effort to secure her release led to his own arrest and torture. He was being falsely labelled as a Jew but confirmed freemason. He was released in April 1943, but died in Paris shortly after in mysterious circumstances.

American actor Rod Steiger cited Baur as one of his favorite actors who had exerted a major influence on his craft and career.

Filmography 

 Monsieur Lecoq (1914)
 Strass et Compagnie (1915)
 The Gold Chignon (1916) as Comte Hector de Nages, aka Bébert
 Flower of Paris (1916, Short) as Harry Podge
 48, avenue de l'Opéra (1917) as Tom Baxler
 Sous la griffe (1917)
 L'âme du bonze (1918)
 The Clairvoyant (1924) as Monsieur Detaille
 David Golder (1931) as David Golder
 Le cap perdu (1937) as Le Capitaine Kell
 Moon Over Morocco (1931) as M. de Marouvelle
 The Polish Jew (1931) as Mathias
 The Red Head (1932) as Monsieur Lepic
 The Three Musketeers (1932) as Tréville
 Criminal (1933) as Warden Brady
 A Man's Neck (1933) as Commissaire Jules Maigret
 Rothchild (1934) as Rothchild
 Les Misérables (1934) as Jean Valjean / Champmathieu
 Le greluchon délicat (1934) as Michel
 A Man of Gold (1934) as Capon
 Moscow Nights (1934) as Piotr Brioukow
 Golgotha (1935) as Hérode
 Crime and Punishment (1935) as Le juge Porphyre
 Dark Eyes (1935) as Ivan Ivanovitch Petroff
 Moscow Nights (1935) as Peter Brioukow
 Le Golem (1936) – L'empereur Rodolphe II as roi de Bohème
 Samson (1936) as Jacques Brachart
 Taras Bulba (1936) as Tarass Boulba
 Beethoven's Great Love (1936) as Ludwig van Beethoven
 Nitchevo (1936) as Le commandant Robert Cartier
 The New Men (1936) as Bourron
 Paris (1937) as Alexandre Lafortune
 Sarati the Terrible (1937) as César Sarati
 The Secrets of the Red Sea (1937) as Saïd Ali
 Life Dances On (1937) as Alain Regnault
 Mollenard (1938) as Captain Mollenard
 Rasputin (1938) as Raspoutine (Rasputin)
  (1938) as Virine, le maitre de poste
 The Patriot (1938) as Le tsar Paul 1er
 The Rebel Son (1938) as Taras Bulba
 The Man from Niger (1940) as Le docteur Bourdet
 President Haudecoeur (1940) as Le président Haudecoeur
 Volpone (1941) as Volpone
 Who Killed Santa Claus? (1941) as Gaspard Cornusse
 Péchés de jeunesse (1941) as Monsieur Lacalade
 Symphonie eines Lebens (1943) as Stephan Melchior (final film role)

References

External links 

1880 births
1943 deaths
French male film actors
French male silent film actors
People from Montrouge
20th-century French male actors
French Freemasons